Zoran Tomić may refer to:
 Zoran Tomić (footballer)
 Zoran Tomić (politician)